The Weight of the Sun is the third studio album by Scottish chamber pop band Modern Studies, released on 8 May 2020 by Fire Records.

Critical reception

The Weight of the Sun was met with generally favourable reviews from critics. At Metacritic, which assigns a weighted average rating out of 100 to reviews from mainstream publications, this release received an average score of 73, based on 6 reviews.

Track listing

Charts

References

External links
 

2020 albums
Fire Records (UK) albums